The Secretary of State for Air was a secretary of state position in the British government, which existed from 1919 to 1964. The person holding this position was in charge of the Air Ministry. The Secretary of State for Air was supported by the Under-Secretary of State for Air.

History
The position was created on 10 January 1919 to manage the Royal Air Force. In 1946, the three posts of Secretary of State for War, First Lord of the Admiralty, and Secretary of State for Air became formally subordinated to that of Minister of Defence, which had itself been created in 1940 for the co-ordination of defence and security issues.  On 1 April 1964, the Air Ministry was incorporated into the newly-created united Ministry of Defence, and the position of Secretary of State for Air was abolished.

List of leaders

Notes

External links
Hansard – Secretary of State for Air

 
Air
20th-century history of the Royal Air Force
1919 establishments in the United Kingdom
1964 disestablishments in the United Kingdom
Defunct ministerial offices in the United Kingdom